Karkowo  (German: Karkow) is a village in the administrative district of Gmina Chociwel, within Stargard County, West Pomeranian Voivodeship, in north-western Poland.

The village has a population of 335.

Before 1945 the village was German-settled and part of the German state of Prussia. At the end of WWII Polish authorities expelled the Germans from the area.

References

Karkowo